The Extractiones de Talmud is a collection of passages from the Babylonian Talmud translated from Hebrew and Aramaic into Latin in 1244–1245. It is the earliest substantial translation of any part of the Talmud into Latin and the largest collection of Latin Talmudic excerpts.

Around 1238, Nicholas Donin, a Jewish convert to Christianity, first translated some excerpts as part of his 35 criticisms of the Talmud that he submitted to Pope Gregory IX in 1239. One result of this effort was the Disputation of Paris (1240), after which the Talmud was condemned and thousands of copies ultimately burned (1242). Pope Innocent IV, who came to the throne in 1243, initiated a review of the case against the Talmud. Commissioned by Odo of Châteauroux, the Dominicans of the convent of Saint-Jacques in Paris began a partial translation of the Talmud (among other Jewish writings).

The resulting Extractiones de Talmud, completed in 1245, contains 1,922 excerpts. There are two surviving versions with different arrangements of the excerpts. The "sequential" version arranges the excerpts in the same order in which they appear in the Talmud. The "thematic" version arranges them by subject under polemical rubrics. There are separate prologues for each version. There are a total of ten manuscript copies of the Extractiones. The most important copy is Paris, Bibliothèque nationale de France, MS lat. 16558 from the 13th century.

The Extractiones contains much more of the Talmud than either Donin's short work or the Pugio fidei of Ramon Martí, which also contains independently translated excerpts.

Editions

Notes

Bibliography

1245 works
Talmud versions and translations
Translations into Latin